Pulltight is an unincorporated community in Mississippi County, in the U.S. state of Missouri.

Pulltight originally developed around the site of a mill. According to tradition, the community was so named because the roads were often impassible, requiring locals to "pull tight" their wagons.

References

Unincorporated communities in Mississippi County, Missouri
Unincorporated communities in Missouri